Garak may refer to:

Places
 Garak, Iran (disambiguation)
 Garak-dong, a neighborhood of Songpa-gu, Seoul, South Korea
 Garak Market, an extensive farmers fish market in the neighborhood of Garak-dong
 Garak Market station, a station on the Seoul Subway Line 8
 Gaya confederacy (also Garak), a confederacy of territorial polities in the Nakdong River basin of southern Korea

Other uses
 Elim Garak, a fictional character from the television series Star Trek: Deep Space Nine

See also
 Gerak, a recurring alien character from the TV series Stargate SG-1